Churubusco Junior-Senior High School is a public secondary school located in Churubusco, Indiana. It serves grades 6-12 for the Smith-Green Community School Corporation.

Athletics
The Churubusco Eagles compete in the Northeast Corner Conference of Indiana. School colors are old gold and black. For the 2019–2020 school year, the following Indiana High School Athletic Association (IHSAA) sanctioned sports were offered:

Baseball (boys) 
Basketball (girls and boys) 
Cross country (girls and boys) 
Football (boys) 
Golf (girls and boys) 
Softball (girls) 
Tennis (girls and boys) 
Track and field (girls and boys) 
Volleyball (girls) 
Wrestling (boys)

Notable alumni
 Brent Gaff, former professional baseball player 
 Harry Gandy, U.S. Representative from South Dakota
 Craig W. Hartman, architect

See also
 List of high schools in Indiana

References

External links
 Churubusco Junior-Senior High School Website

Public high schools in Indiana
Schools in Whitley County, Indiana